Guilherme Araújo Soares (born 8 February 2001) is a Portuguese professional footballer who plays as a centre-back for the Portuguese club Braga B.

Professional career
A youth product of Braga since 2010, Soares was called up to their first team in 2021. He made his professional debut for Braga as a starter in a 0–0 Primeira Liga tie with Portimonense on 19 May 2021. He was assigned to their B-team for the 2021–22 season, where he scored one goal in 23 appearances. He signed a professional contract with Braga on 1 February 2022 until 2025.

References

External links
 
 

2001 births
Living people
Sportspeople from Braga
Portuguese footballers
S.C. Braga players
Primeira Liga players
Association football defenders